Chatham is an unincorporated community located in Bracken County, Kentucky, United States.

History
A post office called Chatham was established in 1871, and remained in operation until 1904. The community was most likely named after Chatham, New York.

References

Unincorporated communities in Bracken County, Kentucky
Unincorporated communities in Kentucky